Bartosz Kapustka (born 23 December 1996) is a Polish professional footballer who plays as a midfielder for Ekstraklasa club Legia Warsaw.

Club career

KS Cracovia 
In October 2012, he started his career after being promoted to KS Cracovia first team squad.

Leicester City
Kapustka was signed by Premier League club Leicester City for a reported £7.5m in August 2016, signing a five-year contract. He cited manager Claudio Ranieri as his motivation for joining the club. Ranieri admitted he was unsure when Kapustka "will be ready to play in the Premier League". Having already played for the Leicester Under-23s, a loan move was not possible due to FIFA rules prohibiting a player from appearing for three clubs in one season.

Kapustka finally made his senior debut for Leicester in a 2–1 FA Cup third-round win at Everton on 7 January 2017, coming on as an 84th-minute substitute for Marc Albrighton. He made his full debut in a 3–1 FA Cup fourth-round replay win over Derby County on 8 February 2017, playing in a central attacking role behind striker Ahmed Musa. Kapustka made 47 touches and two interceptions before he was replaced by Riyad Mahrez in the 81st minute.

SC Freiburg (loan)
On 14 July 2017, Kapustka joined Bundesliga club SC Freiburg on loan for 2017–18 season. The Breisgau-based side secured an option to sign him permanently at the end of the season for a transfer fee of €5 million.

OH Leuven (loan)
On 31 August 2018, Kapustka joined Belgian First Division B club Oud-Heverlee Leuven on loan for 2018–19 season.

Legia Warsaw
On 13 August 2020, Kapustka joined Polish Ekstraklasa club Legia Warsaw on a two-year contract.

International career
On 7 September 2015, Kapustka made his debut appearance for the Poland national team in a match against Gibraltar, substituting Jakub Błaszczykowski. He scored his first goal for the national team on his debut. In the buildup to the Euro 2016, Kapustka was involved in a brawl outside a night club, in which he sustained an injury. Following the incident, he made a phone call personally to Polish national team manager Adam Nawałka, to ask for his forgiveness and ask that he not be excluded from the squad for the upcoming tournament. Kapustka was eventually selected for Poland's Euro 2016 campaign, and produced a standout performance in the team's opening match victory over Northern Ireland.

Career statistics

Club

International
Scores and results list Poland's goal tally first, score column indicates score after each Kapustka goal.

Honours
Legia Warsaw
Ekstraklasa: 2020–21

Individual
Ekstraklasa Player of the Month: February 2021

References

External links

1996 births
Living people
Sportspeople from Tarnów
Association football midfielders
Polish footballers
Poland international footballers
Poland youth international footballers
Poland under-21 international footballers
Ekstraklasa players
Regionalliga players
Bundesliga players
Tarnovia Tarnów players
Hutnik Nowa Huta players
MKS Cracovia (football) players
Leicester City F.C. players
SC Freiburg players
SC Freiburg II players
Oud-Heverlee Leuven players
Challenger Pro League players
UEFA Euro 2016 players
Polish expatriate footballers
Expatriate footballers in England
Polish expatriate sportspeople in England
Expatriate footballers in Germany
Polish expatriate sportspeople in Germany
Expatriate footballers in Belgium
Polish expatriate sportspeople in Belgium
Legia Warsaw players